John James "Tommy" Vereker (December 2, 1893 – April 2, 1974) was a professional American baseball player who played two games for the Baltimore Terrapins of the Federal League during the  season. He was born in Baltimore, Maryland and died there at the age of 80.

External links

1893 births
1974 deaths
Major League Baseball pitchers
Baltimore Terrapins players
Baseball players from Baltimore
Hagerstown Champs players
Hagerstown Terriers players
Waynesboro Villagers players